is a spinoff anime series of the Angelique series.  and its  sequel  were directed by Susumu Kudo and animated by Satelight.

Plot

The story is about a country girl, Ange who is insecure and does not realise the power she possesses until she is invited to a sacred land along with 99 girls who is invited by 9 guardians. The guardians reveal that among them is the legendary etoile who is destined to carry out a mission of saving a galaxy. The etolite will shine brightly when visible. Ange's life changes as she is revealed to be actually a male legendary etolite .

Media

Anime

Koi suru Tenshi Angelique: Kokoro no Mezameru Toki
Koi suru Tenshi Angelique: Kokoro no Mezameru Toki was released by Satelight between July 8, 2006 and September 30, 2006. It uses two pieces of theme music. The opening theme is "Infinite Love" by Granrodeo and the ending theme is "Dearest You" by 2Hearts.

Koi suru Tenshi Angelique: Kagayaki no Ashita
Koi suru Tenshi Angelique: Kagayaki no Ashita was broadcast by Kids Station between January 5, 2007 and March 23, 2007. It uses two pieces of theme music.

Character CDs
King Records released 19 character CDs for Koi suru Tenshi Angelique. The songs are sung by the characters' voice actor/actress. The first and second character CDs for Zephyr and Randy, respectively were released on June 5, 2007. The third, fourth and fifth character CDs for Marcel, Luva and Clavis, respectively, were released on August 9, 2006. The sixth, seventh and eighth character CDs were released on October 4, 2006. The ninth, tenth and eleventh character CDs for Oliver, Arios and Yui, respectively, were released on October 25, 2006. The twelfth, thirteenth and fourteenth character CDs were released on December 21, 2006. The fifteenth and sixteenth character CDs were released on January 11, 2007. The seventeenth, eighteenth and nineteenth character CDs were released on March 21, 2007.

On February 27, 2008, King Records released an album for Koi suru Tenshi Angelique containing all 19 character songs.

Soundtrack CDs
On July 26, 2006, King Records released a soundtrack CD for the Koi Suru Tenshi Angelique: Kokoro no Mezameru Toki opening theme, "Infinite Love" by Granrodeo. On August 23, 2006, King Records released a soundtrack CD for the Koi Suru Tenshi Angelique: Kokoro no Mezameru Toki ending theme, "Dearest You" by 2Hearts. On February 14, 2007, King Records released a soundtrack CD for the Koi Suru Tenshi Angelique: Kagayaki no Ashita opening theme, "Yakusoku No Chi He" by 2Hearts.

Radio CDs
On August 23, 2006, King Records released a radio CD for Koi suru Tenshi Angelique called, Koi Suru Tenshi Angelique Sweet Paradise memory 01. The songs were sung by Kenyu Horiuchi and Daisuke Namikawa. The second radio CD, Koi Suru Tenshi Angelique Sweet Paradise memory 02, was released on December 6, 2006. The songs were sung by Kenyu Horiuchi, Daisuke Namikawa, Show Hayami, Mitsuo Iwata, Nobutoshi Kanna, Nobio Tobita and Toshihiko Seki. The third radio CD, Koi Suru Tenshi Angelique Sweet Paradise memory 03, was released on May 9, 2005.

Drama CDs
On February 21, 2007, King Records released a Drama CD for Koi Suru Tenshi Angelique, called Seichi no Hitotoki Shincho Hen. The songs were sung by Kenyu Horiuchi, Daisuke Namikawa, Show Hayami, Mitsuo Iwata, Nobio Tobita, Hideyuki Tanaka, Hiro Yuuki, Takehito Koyasu, Kyoko Hikami, and Toshihiko Seki.

On April 9, 2008, King Records released another Drama CD for Koi Suru Tenshi Angelique. The songs are sung by Mitsuo Iwata, Nobutoshi Kanna, Toshihiko Seki, Hideyuki Tanaka, Kenyu Horiuchi, Nobio Tobita, Show Hayami, Takehito Koyasu, Kyoko Hikami, Ken Narita, Fumihiko Tachiki, Mitsuaki Madono, Tetsuya Iwananaga, and Yumi Toma.

Reception

References
Specific

General

 Nomura, Fumi et al. "Koi Suru Tenshi Angelique ~Kokoro no Mezameru Toki~". Newtype USA 5 (11) 60–61. November 2006. .

External links
Official Gamecity Koi suru Tenshi Angelique Website 
Official Kids Station Koi suru Tenshi Angelique Website 

2006 Japanese television series endings
2007 Japanese television series endings
Satelight
Anime series
Anime television series based on video games
Angelique (video game series)